Marilyn Monroe (1926–1962) was an American actress.

Marilyn Monroe may also refer to:
"Marilyn Monroe" (Nicki Minaj song)
"Marilyn Monroe" (Pharrell Williams song)
"Marilyn Monroe", a 2007 song by Dala from Who Do You Think You Are
"Marilyn Monroe", a 2011 song by Brianna Perry
"Marilyn Monroe", a song by Phoebe Legere
"Marilyn Monroe", a song from Blood Brothers

See also
 Marilyn (1963 film) or The Marilyn Monroe Story, a documentary film